Matthews Beachcroft was Governor of the Bank of England from 1756 to 1758. He had been Deputy Governor from 1754 to 1756. He replaced Charles Palmer as Governor and was succeeded by Merrick Burrell. Beachcroft's tenure as Governor occurred at the beginning of the Bengal bubble (1757–1769).

See also
Chief Cashier of the Bank of England

References 

Governors of the Bank of England
Year of birth missing
Year of death missing
British bankers
Deputy Governors of the Bank of England